The 2018 Tour de Corse (formally known as the Corsica Linea – Tour de Corse 2018) was a motor racing event for rally cars that was held over four days between 5 and 8 April 2018. It marked the sixty-first running of the Tour de Corse and the fourth round of the 2018 World Rally Championship and its support categories, the WRC-2 and WRC-3 championships. It was also the second round of the Junior World Rally Championship.

Thierry Neuville and Nicolas Gilsoul were the defending rally winners. Their team, Hyundai Shell Mobis WRT, were the defending manufacturers' winners. Sébastien Ogier and Julien Ingrassia were the rally winners. Their team, M-Sport Ford WRT, were the manufacturers' winners. The Škoda Motorsport II crew of Jan Kopecký and Pavel Dresler won the World Rally Championship-2 category in a Škoda Fabia R5, while local crew Jean-Baptiste Franceschi and Romain Courbon won the World Rally Championship-3 and Junior World Rally Championship.

Background

Championship standings prior to the event
Sébastien Ogier and Julien Ingrassia entered the round with a four-point lead in the World Championships for Drivers and Co-drivers. In the World Championship for Manufacturers, Hyundai Shell Mobis WRT held a twelve-point lead over M-Sport Ford WRT.

Route
The route of the 2018 event was substantially revised, with only two of the stages—La Porta – Valle di Rostino and Novella—carried over from the 2017 rally. The event was based in Bastia, which hosted the rally for the first time since 1978.

Entry list
The following crews were entered into the rally. The event was open to crews competing in the World Rally Championship, World Rally Championship-2, and the World Rally Championship-3. The final entry list consisted of fourteen World Rally Cars, eleven World Rally Championship-2 entries, and fifteen World Rally Championship-3 entries, fourteen of which were eligible to score points in the Junior World Rally Championship.

Notes
 — Driver is eligible to score points in the FIA Junior World Rally Championship.

Report

Pre-event

In the week before the rally, the Fédération Internationale de l'Automobile (FIA) approved a rule change affecting the Power Stage. Any crew checking in late to the Power Stage will forfeit the opportunity to score bonus championship points in the Power Stage. The changes were introduced in response to a controversy that arose in previous rallies where crews deliberately checked in late, incurring time penalties but securing a preferable road position, thereby improving their chances of scoring bonus points.

Elfyn Evans' co-driver Daniel Barritt was replaced by Phil Mills as Barritt did not recover from an accident in Rally Mexico in time for the Tour de Corse.

Citroën's new R5 variant of the C3 WRC made its competitive début in the WRC-2 class during the rally.

Thursday
Thursday in Corsica only requires crews to complete a Shakedown. Kris Meeke and Paul Nagle won the stage, over two seconds faster than the Norwegian Andreas Mikkelsen. Last year winner Thierry Neuville finished third, half a second faster than teammate Dani Sordo. Current championship leader Sébastien Ogier was fifth. From sixth to tenth were Elfyn Evans, Sébastien Loeb, Ott Tänak, Jari-Matti Latvala and Esapekka Lappi respectively.

Friday
Defending world champion Sébastien Ogier was absolutely flying in Friday. He set three fastest stage times out of four and built a lead of over half a minute over the last year winner Thierry Neuville, who was struggling with the brakes. Nine-time world champion Sébastien Loeb, competing in the second of three guest appearances, carried too much pace into a left corner 400 metres after the start and dropped into a deep ditch. The rest stage won by Esapekka Lappi, who finished the day in fifth place, just less than one second ahead of Elfyn Evans and Dani Sordo. Kris Meeke, who suffered intermittent intercom problems in his C3, was third, 5.5 seconds ahead of Ott Tänak, who also had handling problems at the rear of his Toyota Yaris. Finland's Jari-Matti Latvala lacked confidence in his Toyota Yaris in eighth. Another 4.2 seconds behind was Andreas Mikkelsen. The Norwegian lost much time with a spin at the first corner in the opening stage and a brief trip into a ditch this morning, issues compounded by understeer when he tried to have a push this afternoon. Local man Bryan Bouffier completed the leaderboard in a Fiesta.

Saturday
Championship leader Sébastien Ogier ended the day with a 44.5 seconds advantage over Thierry Neuville. Ott Tänak snatching position by a tenth of a second from the Belgium in the final Novella test, as Kris Meeke crashed his Citroën C3 into retirement after mishearing a pace note. Esapekka Lappi was another 10.3 seconds behind in fourth place. Dani Sordo and Elfyn Evans were evenly matched all day. The Spaniard ended fifth in his i20, with a 3.1-second advantage over the Welshman who lost time after stalling his Fiesta's engine and being too hesitant on the tricky mountain roads. Andreas Mikkelsen was bothered by understeering this weekend. He finished seventh, ahead of WRC 2 category leader Jan Kopecký. Jari-Matti Latvala retired his Yaris from eighth after slamming the rear into a tree and Bryan Bouffier went out with engine problems in his Fiesta, while nine-time world champion Sébastien Loeb, returning after yesterday's crash, won three stages in his C3. WRC 2 driver Fabio Andolfi and Ole Christian Veiby completed the provisional leaderboard in Škoda Fabia R5s.

Sunday
Sébastien Ogier led the Corsica linea - Tour de Corse from start to finish to win the three-day asphalt fixture by 36.1 seconds in his Ford Fiesta. Ott Tänak finished second in a Toyota Yaris, with Thierry Neuville, who suffered an engine issue at the power Stage, running out of the podium. Teammate Dani Sordo finished fourth after another consistent weekend, just 3.5 seconds ahead of Elfyn Evans. There was final day heartbreak for Esapekka Lappi. The Finn thrust himself into the fight for second yesterday, but his hopes were shattered when he hit a kerb and stopped to change a punctured tyre. He eventually plunged to seventh, but salvaged maximum bonus points by winning the final power Stage in his Yaris as well as overhauling Andreas Mikkelsen to climb to sixth. WRC 2 winner Jan Kopecký finished eighth ahead of Kris Meeke, who restarted today after Saturday's accident, with Yoann Bonato completed the top ten.

Classification

Top ten finishers
The following crews finished the rally in each class's top ten.

Other notable finishers
The following notable crews finished the rally outside top ten.

Special stages

Power stage
The Power stage was a 16.25 km stage at the end of the rally. Additional World Championship points were awarded to the five fastest crews.

J-WRC stage winning crews 
Junior World Rally Championship crews scored additional points. Each of the fastest stage time was awarded with one bonus point.

Penalties
The following notable crews were given time penalty during the rally.

Retirements
The following notable crews retired from the event. Under Rally2 regulations, they were eligible to re-enter the event starting from the next leg. Crews that re-entered were given an additional time penalty.

Championship standings after the rally

Drivers' championships

Co-Drivers' championships

Manufacturers' and teams' championships

Notes

References

External links

  
 2018 Tour de Corse in e-wrc website
 The official website of the World Rally Championship

France
2018 in French motorsport
April 2018 sports events in France
2018 Tour de Corse